Gallo cedrone is a 1998 Italian comedy film directed by Carlo Verdone.

Cast
Carlo Verdone as Armando Feroci
Regina Orioli as Martina Saviotti
Paolo Triestino as Franco Feroci
Ines Nobili as Marcella Sesti-Feroci
Enrica Rosso as Egle
Giorgia Brugnoli as adult Morena
Alessia Bruno as young Morena
Roberto Mincuzzi as Quinto
Maria Luisa Busi as herself
Gina Rovere as the club's owner
Albano Bufalini as Franco
Gloria Sirabella as the hairdresser
Mimmo Petrelli as Attilio
Marcello Magnelli as Delio
Costantino Valente as Dante
Stefano Ambrogi as Romano
Roberto Sbaratto as Doctor Bissanti
Any Cerreto as Amelia

References

External links

1998 films
Films directed by Carlo Verdone
1990s Italian-language films
1998 comedy films
Italian comedy films
1990s Italian films